The 2020–21 season was Oldham Athletic's 126th season in their history and third consecutive season in the English football's fourth tier. Along with competing in League Two, the club also participated in this season's editions of the FA Cup, EFL Cup and EFL Trophy. In March 2021 near the end of the season Harry Kewell was sacked along with assistant Alan Maybury. The following day Keith Curle was appointed manager.

Transfers

Transfers in

Loans in

Loans out

Transfers out

Pre-season

Competitions

EFL League Two

League table

Results summary

Results by matchday

Matches

The 2020–21 season fixtures were released on 21 August.

FA Cup

The draw for the first round was made on Monday 26, October. The second round draw was revealed on Monday, 9 November by Danny Cowley. The third round draw was made on 30 November, with Premier League and EFL Championship clubs all entering the competition.

EFL Cup

The first round draw was made on 18 August, live on Sky Sports, by Paul Merson. The draw for both the second and third round were confirmed on September 6, live on Sky Sports by Phil Babb.

EFL Trophy

The regional group stage draw was confirmed on 18 August. The second round draw was made by Matt Murray on 20 November, at St Andrew’s.

References

Oldham Athletic A.F.C. seasons
Barrow